NGC 1087 is an intermediate spiral galaxy in Cetus.  The central bar/core is very small with many irregular features in the surrounding disk of material.  With the many strange features of NGC 1087, its true nature is still uncertain. It has an extremely small nucleus and a very short stellar bar. Unlike most barred galaxies, the bar apparently has some new star-formation taking place. There is a multiple spiral structure defined more by the dust lanes than by luminous matter. Overall, the disc has a very low surface brightness. Even though it appears close to another galaxy (NGC 1090), these two galaxies are not interacting and should be considered isolated from one another.

NGC 1087 lies near the small M77 (NGC 1068) galaxy group that also includes NGC 936, NGC 1055, and NGC 1090. However, because of its distance, it probably is not an actual group member.

Based on the published red shift, (Hubble Constant of 62 km/s per Mpc) a rough distance estimate for NGC 1087 is 80 million light-years, with a diameter of about 86,800 light-years. The type II supernova SN 1995V is the only recorded supernova in NGC 1087.

References

External links 
 

Intermediate spiral galaxies
Cetus (constellation)
1087
02245
10496